Jo Seon-joo is a South Korean actress. She is known for her roles in dramas such as One Thousand Won Lawyer, Mr. Queen, One the Woman and Black Dog: Being A Teacher. She also appeared in movies The Houseguest and My Mother, Someone Behind You, Veteran and Miracle: Letters to the President.

Filmography

Television series

Film

Awards and nominations

References

External links 
 

1977 births
Living people
People from Jeonju
21st-century South Korean actresses
South Korean television actresses
South Korean film actresses